At Home is a 1968 Canadian short documentary film directed by Martin Lavut. The film documents Lavut's home life, including his relationship with his girlfriend Adrienne Horswill. The film was originally commissioned by CBC Television, but the network declined to air the finished product.

The film won the award for Best Canadian Film at the Vancouver International Film Festival, and the Canadian Film Award for Best Film Under 30 Minutes at the 21st Canadian Film Awards in 1969.

References

External links
At Home at the Canadian Filmmakers Distribution Centre

1968 films
Canadian short documentary films
Best Theatrical Short Film Genie and Canadian Screen Award winners
1960s short documentary films
Films directed by Martin Lavut
1960s English-language films
1960s Canadian films